The Studebaker Dictator is an automobile produced by the Studebaker Corporation of South Bend, Indiana, United States from 1927 until 1937. Model year 1928 was the first full year of Dictator production.

In the mid-1920s, Studebaker began renaming its vehicles. The model previously known as the Studebaker Standard Six became the Dictator during the 1927 model year—internally  designated model GE. The name was intended to connote that the model "dictated the standard" that other automobile makes would be obliged to follow. Dictators were available in a full range of body-styles.

The Dictator was Studebaker's lowest-price model, followed (in ascending order) by the Studebaker Commander and Studebaker President series. There was also a Chancellor model in 1927, but that year only. In June 1929, Studebaker began offering an 8-cylinder engine for the Dictator series (221 cubic inches, 70 bhp at 3,200 rpm), designed by Barney Roos, though the old 6-cylinder option was continued for another year. There was no 1933 Dictator due to Studebaker's bankruptcy, and a redesigned lower-priced model was released in 1934 with a 6-cylinder engine. The 8-cylinder engine was then on only available for the Commander and President models.

Consequences of the Dictator name
In retrospect, the choice of the model name might seem unfortunate. One writer began a history of American perceptions of dictators with the introduction of the Studebaker Dictator. He noted there were political problems in the name 'Dictator', making it unusable in European monarchies. The same applied in British Empire countries which imported the car. Diplomatically, Studebaker marketed its Standard Six as the Director in these countries. In the United States the name initially caused no problems.

At the time, the only dictator that would have immediately come to an American mind was Benito Mussolini, whose popular image was one of audacity and strength, in spite of well-publicized fascist violence. However the rise of Adolf Hitler in Germany tainted the word 'dictator'. Studebaker abruptly discontinued the name 'Dictator' in 1937, resurrecting the Commander name which had been dropped in 1935. At that time, Raymond Loewy and Helen Dryden were working on new concepts for body design and customer appeal.

References

Dictator
Cars introduced in 1927
1930s cars